Tom Kellichan (born c. 1954) was the original drummer of The Skids, from 1977 to 1979.

Biography

From Cowdenbeath, and a former van driver, he completed the line-up of The Skids after answering their ad for a drummer. During his tenure the band released the singles Charles (as Thomas) and Into The Valley, the Wide Open EP (which featured The Saints Are Coming) and the Scared to Dance album. After touring with the band in 1979, promoting Scared to Dance, he departed, being replaced by Rusty Egan.

After The Skids, he played drums for Bill Nelson (of Be-Bop Deluxe), in the song "Decline And Fall", for the Quit Dreaming And Get On The Beam album (1981). He later played in a band called Secrets.

He is now running a music bar, called "The Sax Bar", in The Patch, Playa de las Américas, Tenerife; and still playing drums in a house band called Real Deal.

Discography

The Skids
Charles EP (No Bad, 1977)
Wide Open EP (Virgin, 1978)
Scared To Dance album (1979)

Bill Nelson
Quit Dreaming And Get On The Beam (1981)

References

External links
Skids official web
Skids Fan Website

1950s births
People from Cowdenbeath
Living people
Scottish rock drummers
British male drummers
Skids (band) members